The High Commission of Kenya in Ottawa is Kenya's primary diplomatic mission in Canada. It is located at 415 Laurier Avenue East in Ottawa, the Canadian capital. The High Commission also serves as the Kenyan Mission to the International Civil Aviation Organization.

Kenya also has an honorary consulate in Vancouver, British Columbia.

See also
 Canada–Kenya relations

External links
 Kenya High Commission in Ottawa
  , Department of Foreign Affairs and International Trade (Canada), August 2007

References

Kenya
Ottawa
Canada–Kenya relations